is a Japanese animation studio based in Sekimachi-kita, Nerima-ku, Tokyo. The studio was founded on September 3, 2008, by Takeshi Eriguchi.

Works

Television series

Original video animation

References

External links
 Official website 
 

 
Animation studios in Tokyo
Japanese animation studios
Japanese companies established in 2008
Mass media companies established in 2008